Trojan Darveniza (30 November 1921 – 23 May 2015) was an Australian rules footballer.

Playing career
Darveniza played six games for St Kilda in the Victorian Football League, all during the 1946 season. He was from Mooroopna

References

External links
 
 

1921 births
2015 deaths
St Kilda Football Club players
Australian rules footballers from Victoria (Australia)
Shepparton Football Club players